is a railway station in the city of Kariya, Aichi Prefecture,  Japan, operated by Meitetsu.

Lines

Station layout
The station has a single island platform connected to the road by a level crossing. The station has automatic turnstiles for the Tranpass system of magnetic fare cards, and is unattended.

Platforms

Adjacent stations

|-
!colspan=5|Nagoya Railroad

Station history
Ogakie Station was opened on February 5, 1914, as a station on the privately-owned Mikawa Railway Company.  The Mikawa Railway Company was taken over by Meitetsu on June 1, 1941. The station has been unattended since 2005.

Passenger statistics
In fiscal 2017, the station was used by an average of 3604 passengers daily.

Surrounding area
 Ogakie Elementary School

See also
 List of Railway Stations in Japan

External links

 Official web page

Railway stations in Japan opened in 1914
Railway stations in Aichi Prefecture
Stations of Nagoya Railroad
Kariya, Aichi